An Estonian travel document for refugees is an internationally recognised travel document issued to refugees by the Police and Border Guard Board of the Ministry of Internal Affairs in Estonia in accordance to the 1951 United Nations Convention Relating to the Status of Refugees.

Identity Information Page

The Estonian travel document for refugees includes the following data:

 Photo of passport holder
 Type (S)
 Code of Issuing State (EST)
 Passport No.
 1 Surname
 2 Given Names
 3 Nationality
 4 Date of Birth
 5 Personal No.
 6 Sex
 7 Place of Birth
 8 Date of Issue
 9 Authority
 10 Date of Expiry
 11 Holder's Signature

External links 
 Information about Refugee’s travel document by Estonian Police and Border Guard Board
 Sample travel document for refugee, issued by Estonian Police and Border Guard Board and provided to the PRADO document database

Government of Estonia
Refugee travel documents